Pack Bridge is a bridge in the Scottish town of Alyth, Perth and Kinross. Intended to carry packhorses loaded with panniers across Alyth Burn, it is one of the oldest masonry bridges in Scotland and is shown on maps as far back as 1600, but is believed to date to the early 16th century. The bridge was rebuilt in 1674 and increased in height with its wide parapets in the 19th century, but retained its original  width. Today, the bridge carries pedestrian traffic between Pitnacree Street and Chapel Street.

References

Bridges in Perth and Kinross
Stone bridges in Scotland
Pedestrian bridges in Scotland
Bridges completed in the 16th century
16th-century establishments in Scotland